Eupithecia leptogrammata is a moth in the  family Geometridae. It is found in Russia.

References

Moths described in 1882
leptogrammata
Moths of Asia